Willy Fascher (born 5 May 1912, date of death unknown) was a German fencer. He competed in the individual and team foil and team sabre events at the 1952 Summer Olympics.

References

1912 births
Year of death missing
German male fencers
Olympic fencers of West Germany
Fencers at the 1952 Summer Olympics